Pygopleurus vulpes is a species of beetles from the Glaphyridae family.

Description
The males of these beetles are completely covered by long hairs. They do not show variability of integuments and setae, but their color ranges from the common straw-yellow color to reddish and dark orange color. In the females the pronotum is greenish and the brown elytrae remain visible.

Distribution
This species is present in Albania, Bulgaria, Greece, North Macedonia, Romania, Russia and Ukraine.

Bibliography
 Miksic R. (1955) Bemerkungen über die Variabilität einiger Amphicoma-Arten, Fragmenta Balcanica Musei Macedonici Scientiarum Naturalium. Skopje 1(20):175-179
  Truqui E. (1848) Amphicoma et Eulasia insectorum coleopterorum genera, Studi Entomologia :1-48
  Fabricius J.C. (1781) Species insectorum, exhibentes eorum differentias specificas, synonyma auctorum, loca natalia, metamorphosian, adiectis observationibus, descriptionibus. Tom.I, Carol.Ernest.Bohnii, Hamburgi et Kilonii, VIII:1-552
  Pallas P.S. (1781) Icones Insectorum praesertim Rossiae Siberiaeque pecularium quae collegit et Descriptionibus illustravit, Walther. Erlangae:1-96
  Fabricius J.C. (1792) Entomologia systematica emendata et aucta. Secundum Classes, Ordines, Genera, Species adjectis Synonimis, Locis, Observationibus, Descriptionibus, Hafniae. C. G. Proft & fils 1:1-538
  Scarabs: World Scarabaeidae Database. Schoolmeesters P.

References

Glaphyridae
Beetles described in 1781